Biniés is a locality located in the municipality of Canal de Berdún, in Huesca province, Aragon, Spain. As of 2020, it has a population of 33.

Geography 
Biniés is located 85km north-northwest of Huesca.

References

Populated places in the Province of Huesca